Sakina Boutamine (born 2 June 1953) is a retired Algerian female middle-distance runner who specialised in 1500 metres and 3000 metres. She won gold medals in both events in the inaugural 1979 African Championships in Dakar.

International competitions

References

External links

1953 births
Living people
Algerian female middle-distance runners
African Games gold medalists for Algeria
African Games silver medalists for Algeria
African Games medalists in athletics (track and field)
Mediterranean Games bronze medalists for Algeria
Athletes (track and field) at the 1979 Mediterranean Games
Mediterranean Games medalists in athletics
Athletes (track and field) at the 1978 All-Africa Games
21st-century Algerian women
20th-century Algerian women